"Teléfono" is a song recorded by Spanish singer Aitana, written by Aitana, Andrés Torres, and Mauricio Rengifo, and produced by the latter two. The song was released as a single by Universal Music Spain on 27 July 2018. A remix featuring Venezuelan Internet personality and singer Lele Pons was released on 21 November.

Commercially, "Teléfono" became Aitana's second number-one single in Spain after "Lo malo", and has been certified 3× platinum in her home country by Productores de Música de España. A music video for the song was released prior to its single release on 26 July 2018, which went on to become the most-watched Vevo music video within 24 hours of all-time in Spain. The song was certified Platinum in the United States in May 2020.

Track listing

Charts

Weekly charts 

Remix

Year-end charts

Certifications

Release history

References

External links 
 

2018 singles
2018 songs
Aitana (singer) songs
Number-one singles in Spain
Spanish-language songs
Spanish pop songs
Universal Music Group singles
Songs written by Andrés Torres (producer)
Song recordings produced by Andrés Torres (producer)
Songs written by Aitana (singer)
Songs written by Mauricio Rengifo